The Earth Observing System (EOS) Clearinghouse, or ECHO refers to a system that was used by the National Aeronautics and Space Administration (NASA) to spatially, temporally and otherwise index the petabytes of data that NASA's Earth Science projects collect. It does not hold the data itself, but serves as a search engine that other applications can access via a web service based interface. While ECHO has been set up to support both data and services, as of mid-2008, data is well represented and services are yet to be focused on.

History 
In the late 1990s, NASA recognized that the emerging internet technologies would facilitate a democratization of the access to data. NASA began the ECHO effort as a prototype, using web technology to allow the public extensive access to data previously only available to researchers. Access was initially through an application programming interface, not a graphical user interface.

The system was originally specified by a multi-contractor and government committee. The contractor Global Science and Technology led software development from 1999 until 2007. Following that, the work moved to the NASA EOSDIS contractor. Blueprint Technologies (later Vangent) also contributed to the process.

Retirement 
In 2017, the Common Metadata Repository (CMR) replaced ECHO as a high-performance, high-quality, continuously evolving metadata system that catalogs all data and service metadata records for NASA's EOSDIS. CMR will be the authoritative management system for all EOSDIS metadata.

External links 
Official CMR website

NASA online